Le Tote is an online women's clothing rental business in the United States which uses a subscription box model. It was founded in 2012 by Brett Northart (now President) and Rakesh Tondon (now CEO). In 2019, Le Tote acquired Lord & Taylor.

Le Tote is one of several companies renting women's clothes; competitors include Rent the Runway, The Ms. Collection, Gwynnie Bee, and Armarium. While Rent the Runway focuses more on high-end, "event-driven" clothes, Le Tote mainly rents "everyday wear."

In late August 2019, Le Tote finalized an agreement with Hudson's Bay Company to buy the Lord & Taylor chain for C$99.5 million in cash on closing (probably before year end 2019) plus C$33.2 million two years later. HBC was to get a 25% equity stake in Le Tote. The buyer would retain the stores' inventory, with an estimated value of C$284.2 million. The deal required HBC to pay the stores' rent for at least three years, at an estimated C$77 million cash per year.

On August 2, 2020, Le Tote and subsidiary of Le Tote, Lord & Taylor filed for Chapter 11 bankruptcy protection citing the COVID-19 pandemic. They were purchased by the investment firm Saadia Group on October 20, 2020.

References

External links

American companies established in 2012
Retail companies established in 2012
Internet properties established in 2012
Non-store retailing
Companies based in San Francisco
Subscription services
Clothing rental companies
Companies that filed for Chapter 11 bankruptcy in 2020